This list contains Romanian urban localities (municipalities or towns) in which ethnic Hungarians make up over 5% of the total population, according to the 2011 census, ordered by their percentage of the local population. (Note that ethnic data were unavailable for a certain percentage of residents counted during that census, and these were excluded from the total.) The Hungarians are an ethnic group which make up 6.5% of Romania's population, with nearly all living in Transylvania, where they make up 19.1% of the population. They form at least 5% of the population in 85 of Transylvania's 143 towns, accounting for 97.6% of the region's 625,691 urban Hungarians. There are numerous rural localities (communes and villages) which also have Hungarian populations exceeding 5% of the total population, even though those are not listed here.

In localities where Hungarians make up more than 20% of the population, the Hungarian language can be used when addressing local authorities, while state-funded education and bilingual signs are also provided. This arrangement applies in many communes, as well as in thirty-five cities and towns.

 By maternal language.

Notes

Hungarians in Romania
Hungarians
Romania